Thomas Richard Turner (September 8, 1916 – May 14, 1986) was a Major League Baseball catcher who played with the Chicago White Sox and the St. Louis Browns from  to . Turner served in the military during World War II in 1945.

External links

1916 births
1986 deaths
Major League Baseball catchers
Baseball players from Oklahoma
Chicago White Sox players
St. Louis Browns players
Philadelphia Athletics scouts
American military personnel of World War II
Caruthersville Pilots players